Paul Joseph Browning (born August 5, 1992) is an American football wide receiver who is currently a free agent. He played college football at Colorado State University–Pueblo, where he earned All-American and All-Conference honors. He was signed by the Cleveland Browns after the 2015 NFL Draft. On March 19, 2018, Browning was assigned to the Albany Empire. On March 24, 2018, he was placed on refuse to report.

On March 5, 2019, Brown was assigned to the expansion Atlantic City Blackjacks.

He wears number 19, in honour of his late college teammate and best friend Ronell McNeal.

For the Destroyers, he wears number 81.

References

External links
 CSU–Pueblo ThunderWolves bio

1992 births
Living people
American football wide receivers
Cleveland Gladiators players
Baltimore Brigade players
Cleveland Browns players
Carolina Panthers players
Orlando Predators players
People from El Paso County, Colorado
Players of American football from Colorado
Albany Empire (AFL) players
CSU Pueblo ThunderWolves football players
Atlantic City Blackjacks players